Ardmore Airport may refer to:

 Ardmore Airport (New Zealand) in Manurewa, Auckland, New Zealand (IATA: AMZ)
 Ardmore Airport (Alabama) in Ardmore, Alabama, United States (FAA: 1M3)
 Ardmore Downtown Executive Airport in Ardmore, Oklahoma, United States (FAA: 1F0)
 Ardmore Municipal Airport in Ardmore, Oklahoma, United States (FAA: ADM)
Ardmore Air Force Base, a former military airport located there
Ardmore Army Air Field, an earlier name of the military airport